The 2009-10 North Dakota Fighting Sioux women's ice hockey season took place under head coach Brian Idalski.

Offseason
July 9: University of North Dakota women's ice hockey transfers Monique Lamoureux and Jocelyne Lamoureux were selected as part of 41 players to participate in the 2009 USA Hockey Women's National Festival, which took place August 18–24 in Blaine, Minnesota. It served as the selection camp for the 2009-10 United States women's national ice hockey team competed in the Qwest Tour, a 10-game domestic tour that began Sept. 25 and ended just prior to the start of the 2010 Olympic Winter Games in Vancouver, British Columbia.
August 6: Director of athletics Brian Faison announced the resignation of women's hockey assistant coach Grant Kimball, who accepted the position of associate head coach with the University of Vermont's women's hockey program.
August 11: Head coach Brian Idalski announced the hiring of Courtney Drennen on Tuesday as an interim assistant coach for the 2009-10 season. Drennen came to UND after spending the last four seasons as a goaltender in the Mercyhurst College program.
September 9: The WCHA announced that North Dakota defenseman Kelly Lewis and forward Alyssa Wiebe were named as WCHA All-Stars. The two players are among 22 players from the conference to face the 2009-10 U.S Women’s National Team in St. Paul, Minn. on September 25.

Exhibition

Regular season
October 9: The U.S. Women’s National Team took on North Dakota in Warroad, Minnesota, in the second game of the Qwest Tour. It was a preview for the North Dakota program and U.S. players Jocelyne and Monique Lamoureux, who joined the Fighting Sioux in the next season.
March 3: The University announced the hiring of longtime coach of the Swedish Women's National Team Peter Elander as an associate coach for the 2010-11 season.

Players
Senior Cassandra Flanagan finished her Sioux career second all-time in games played (142). 
 Sara Dagenais led the Fighting Sioux in goals this season with 10.
Alyssa Wiebe, led the Sioux with 30 points (9 goals, 21 assists). Her 21 assists this season set a new program record for most assists in a single season.
Goalie Jordi Dagfinrud set single-season records in goals against average (2.39) and save percentage (.923).

Standings
{{2009–10 WCHA standings (women)|team = UND}}

Roster

Schedule

Player stats

Skaters

Goaltenders

Postseason

International
April 7: Jordan Slavin was named to the 2010 U.S. Women's National Under-18 Team.

Awards and honors
Sara Dagenais, All-WCHA Academic Team 
Jorid Dagfinrud, WCHA Defensive Player of the Week (Week of October 5)
Jorid Dagfinrud, All-WCHA Academic Team 
Cassandra Flanagan, All-WCHA Academic Team 
Mary Loken, WCHA Rookie of the Week (Week of January 4)
Margot Miller, All-WCHA Academic Team 
Stephanie Roy, All-WCHA Academic Team 
Alyssa Wiebe, All-WCHA Academic Team (To qualify for the All-WCHA Academic Team, student-athletes must have one year at the present college and a grade point average of at least 3.0 for the previous two semesters.)

References

External links
Official site

North Dakota
North Dakota Fighting Hawks women's ice hockey seasons
Bison North Dakota
2010 in sports in North Dakota